Turton School is a mixed comprehensive secondary school and sixth form in Bromley Cross, in the Metropolitan Borough of Bolton, Greater Manchester, England.

History and information

Construction for the main school buildings started in 1939, but were postponed due to the Second World War. The school eventually opened in April 1954. The school buildings were extensively renovated in 2018 which included a new dining room, library, learning support area and English department. It is over-subscribed, with two applications per place. Facilities include a community swimming pool and sports hall. The school enjoys sporting success in hockey, netball, football, rugby, basketball, tennis, cricket, rounders, badminton, table tennis, volleyball, and softball, and also offers dance, gymnastics, swimming, and aerobics.

There are junior and senior choirs, a training orchestra and senior orchestra, wind band, flute choir, brass band, string quartet and wind quartet. Other extra-curricular activities range from chess, technology and computers to drama and writing groups that produce a school magazine and newsletter. Turton High also offers an industrial awareness conference, Young Enterprise, sixth-form debating and a variety of charity events.

Admissions
Re-organised as a comprehensive in 1971, the school is situated in the northern extremity of Bolton in a suburban commuter area.

Sixth form

The Sixth Form at Turton offers over 35 Advanced Level courses and is based in a purpose-built centre with all the facilities you would expect to support a quality learning environment.

In addition to the expected Common Room, ICT facilities and Study Area, the Sixth Form has an all-day snack bar, conference room, green screen television studio and media suite.

Pupils join the Sixth Form from all the schools in the local area and beyond due to the ease of access. Over half of these have not previously attended the main school and it is 
very much a new start for all those who join.

The current Sixth Form building opened in July 2002.

Awards and achievements
Awarded Healthy School status in March 2007
The latest Ofsted report states: "Standards are well above average and rising, as a result of good teaching and teachers' effective use of data to set targets"
Teachernet school achievement award winner
FA charter standard school

Senior staff
Headteacher: Ms S. Gorse 
Deputy Headteachers: Mrs C. Bach. Ms C. Baily 
Director of Sixth Form: Mrs K. Bali
Assistant Headteachers: Mrs J L Edge.											
Miss A Lane																													
Miss N R Parry															
 Associate Assistant Headteachers:
Mr J Bach - Also SENCO

Notable alumni

Harry Brockbank (born 1998), English footballer, Former player for Bolton Wanderers. now playing for St Patrick’s Athletic FC
James Carlton (aka James Slark; born 1977), Actor, Emmerdale and Heartbeat
Justin Chadwick (born 1968), Producer of The Other Boleyn Girl and Long Walk to Freedom.
Gabriel Clark (born 1998), Actor, Hollyoaks.
John Cunliffe (born 1984), former professional footballer in the United States.
David Flitcroft (born 1974), Footballer now Director of Football at Port Vale
Garry Flitcroft (born 1972), Footballer Blackburn Rovers and Manchester City 
Jack Harrison (born 1996), Footballer playing for Leeds United.
Paul Heathcote (born 1960), Chef
Chris Hunt (born 1968), Badminton Gold medalist European and Commonwealth
Andy Kellett (born 1993), footballer Bolton, Plymouth, now Wigan
Tom Lancashire (born 1985), Middle-distance athlete 2008 Olympian
David Andrew Phoenix (born 1966), Biochemist and Educationalist
Craig Pilling (born 1986), Wrestling Commonwealth Games 2014 Bronze Medallist
Clare Pollard (born 1978), Poet and playwright
Paul Sixsmith (born 1971), International Footballer for Malta
Stuart Stokes (born 1976), Athlete, 2012 Olympian 3000m Steeplechase
Simon Whaley (born 7 June 1985), former footballer playing for Bury, Preston North End, Barnsley, Norwich City, Rochdale and Bradford City.
Sammy Winward (born 1985), Actress, Emmerdale.

References

External links
Welcome to the VLE
Main School Website
Ofsted Reports

Secondary schools in the Metropolitan Borough of Bolton
Community schools in the Metropolitan Borough of Bolton